The Women's tandem sprint B at the 2014 Commonwealth Games, was part of the cycling programme, which took place on 24 July 2014.

Results

Qualifying

Semi-finals

Finals

References

Men's tandem 1km time trial B
Cycling at the Commonwealth Games – Women's tandem sprint B
Comm